The Buor-Yuryakh (Buor-Ürex) is a river in the Sakha Republic (Yakutia), Russia. It is the second largest tributary of the Alazeya.

The Buor-Yuryakh flows north of the Arctic Circle, across desolate territories of the Srednekolymsky District. The name of the river comes from the Yakut "Буор Үрэх" "Buor" = earth, clay / "Yurekh" = river.

Course
The Buor-Yuryakh is a right tributary of the Alazeya. It has its sources in the Kolyma Lowland, off the southern foothills of the Alazeya Plateau. The river flows across a floodplain among numerous lakes forming meanders all along its course. 
It heads first in a roughly southeastward direction. South of the area of lake Ilka it bends and turns east. Then it turns northeastwards to the east of the lake, bending again eastwards after a stretch, leaving lake Balyma to the south. Finally the Buor-Yuryakh bends northwards to the west of lake Nikolskoye and joins the Alazeya  from its mouth.

Tributaries  
There are more than 2,100 lakes in the river basin. The Buor-Yuryakh is frozen between the first half of October and early June.

See also
List of rivers of Russia

References

External links 
Fishing & Tourism in Yakutia

Tributaries of the Alazeya
Rivers of the Sakha Republic
East Siberian Lowland
Alazeya basin